The Battle of Mogadishu began on 21 March 2007 in the Shirkole area of Mogadishu between Somali Transitional Federal Government forces and allied Ethiopian troops, and Islamist insurgents.  The battle usually includes the dates, when referenced, in order to distinguish it amongst the nine major Battles of Mogadishu during the decades-long Somali Civil War.

The battle

First round of fighting
A failed 21 March and 22 disarmament operation by the TFG resulted in the capture of TFG troops.

Cargo plane shot down

On 23 March 2007, a TransAVIAexport Airlines Ilyushin Il-76 plane crashed in Mogadishu.  The plane is thought to have been shot down. There were 11 people on board the aircraft, all but one Belarusian crew members died in the crash. The other remaining survivors were found wandering around the crash site and later died in hospitals.

2nd round of fighting
On 1 April, it was reported that the death toll of the previous four days of heavy fighting in the capital is at least 849 killed civilians, 200 insurgents and 36 Ethiopian soldiers along with the one Ugandan soldier, for a total of 1,086 dead.

2nd ceasefire
Fighting was essentially halted for 2 April, after Hawiye clan leaders declared a truce with Ethiopian military officials starting 2 pm 1 April. They further called on Ethiopian troops to withdraw from areas they had occupied during the past few days of fighting. Although there had been a lull in fighting on 2 April, Salad Ali Jelle, the deputy Defence Minister of the TFG denied that there had been or would be any ceasefires between Hawiye clan leaders and Ethiopian military forces. Jelle stated that it was not Hawiyes involved in the recent fighting, but "remnants of the defeated Islamist" and called upon civilians residing in insurgent positions to evacuate the area.

3rd round of fighting
On 11 April, at least two people have been killed and three others were wounded in a renewed fighting that erupted in north of the Somalia capital between interim government troops and local insurgents overnight. However, on 12 April Somalia's Ambassador to Ethiopia Abdikarin Farah stated that Mogadishu was now peaceful for the first time in sixteen years.

On 14 April, two government soldiers are killed in an ambush in the capital.

On 17 April, heavy street fighting renewed in the northern part of Mogadishu, with at least 11 dead civilians. And on the next day heavy mortar fire erupted killing another 3 civilians. The fighting continued into 19 April, with another 12 civilians dead, while a suicide car bomb exploded at an Ethiopian army base wounding at least 10 Ethiopian soldiers. In addition 10 more soldiers were wounded when their truck hit a landmine in the city.

Aid workers report that nearly half a million people fled the city, almost 1/2 of the population and only fighters and men protecting their property remain in the city.

It was reported that in the latest round of fighting from 17 to 24 April, at least 358 people had been killed, including 45 insurgents, and 680 were wounded. It is estimated that close to 320,000 Somalis have fled Mogadishu since February, with many more still trapped there.

On 26 April, Ethiopian troops took insurgent strongholds in Northern Mogadishu. They first occupied Tawfiq and Ramadan, before moving further north and capturing the Balad checkpoint in Northern Mogadishu, the main one for Mogadishu and an important supply line for insurgents.

Somali Prime Minister Ali Mohammed Ghedi declared victory over the insurgents on 26 April, saying "the worst of the fighting in the city is now over" and urging displaced residents to return to their homes. He also claimed that his forces, backed by Ethiopian tanks and artillery, had overrun an insurgent stronghold in northern Mogadishu, capturing at least 100 enemy fighters.

See also
Somali Civil War
Battle of Mogadishu (1993)
Battle of Mogadishu (2006)
Fall of Mogadishu (2006)
Battle of Mogadishu (November 2007)
Battle of Mogadishu (2008)
Battle of South Mogadishu (2009)
Battle of Mogadishu (2009)
Battle of Mogadishu (2010–11)

Notes

External links
Helicopter downing photo

2007 in Ethiopia
2007 in Somalia
Urban warfare
21st century in Mogadishu
Mogadishu 2007-03
March 2007 events in Africa
April 2007 events in Africa